The Filmfare Award for Best Debut Director is given by Filmfare at its annual Filmfare Awards for Hindi films to recognise directors for their debut films. It was first presented in 2010 in the inaugural year.

List of winners

2010s
2010 Ayan Mukerji – Wake Up Sid & Zoya Akhtar – Luck by Chance
2011Maneesh Sharma – Band Baaja Baaraat
2012Abhinay Deo – Delhi Belly
2013Gauri Shinde – English Vinglish
2014Ritesh Batra – The Lunchbox
2015Abhishek Varman – 2 States
2016Neeraj Ghaywan – Masaan
2017Ashwiny Iyer Tiwari – Nil Battey Sannata
2018Konkona Sen Sharma – A Death in the Gunj
2019Amar Kaushik – Stree

2020s
2020Aditya Dhar – Uri: The Surgical Strike
2021Rajesh Krishnan – Lootcase
2022Seema Pahwa – Ramprasad Ki Tehrvi

See also
Filmfare Awards
Bollywood
Cinema of India

References

External links

Director, Debut
Directorial debut film awards